Karor railway station or Karor Lal Esan railway station is  located in Karor Lal Esan,  Pakistan.

See also
 List of railway stations in Pakistan
 Pakistan Railways

References

External links

Railway stations in Layyah District
Railway stations on Kotri–Attock Railway Line (ML 2)